Magnolia lenticellata is a species of plant in the family Magnoliaceae. It is endemic to Colombia.

References

lenticellata
Vulnerable plants
Endemic flora of Colombia
Taxonomy articles created by Polbot